Svetozar Vujković (1899–1949) was a Serbian police officer who commanded the Banjica concentration camp during World War II. He was a high-ranking official in the pre-war Belgrade police and was involved in the persecution of communists in Yugoslavia during the interwar period. 

Vujković collaborated enthusiastically with the Gestapo following the Axis invasion of Yugoslavia. He was made Special Police commander at Banjica on 5 August 1941 and was later the victim of a failed assassination attempt by Serbian anti-fascists. As the commander at Banjica, he ordered murders and devised torture techniques. Execution lists were drawn up by him beginning in 1942. Vujković often selected victims, including children, at random, and had murders carried out by members of the Belgrade Special Police and the Serbian State Guard. He is said to have personally participated in interrogations and devised numerous humiliating methods of torture. Executions occurred frequently at his whim and he rarely asked for approval from German or Serbian authorities to carry out murders and ordered prisoners killed even in cases where the Ministry of Interior decided against execution. Vujković is reported to have begged the Germans to "personally shoot twenty young girls who were ordered for shooting" on one occasion. Despite this, neither he nor any other Serbs holding positions of power in the camp were reprimanded or removed from their posts by the Serbian collaborationist government. When prisoners in Banjica complained of lack of food, Vujković and his associates often replied by saying: "[You] didn't come here for spa therapy and food, but to be executed. To eat more or less will not save your lives." 

Vujković was captured by the Anglo-American forces and extradited to Yugoslavia at the end of the war. In July 1949, he testified before the Yugoslav State Commission and explained that Serbian collaborationist forces saved countless Serb civilians from being executed as German hostages by swapping them with Roma prisoners. He died in 1949.

Notes

References

Books

 
 
 

1899 births
1949 deaths
People from Smederevska Palanka
People from the Kingdom of Serbia
Serbian collaborators with Nazi Germany
Serbian fascists
Serbian anti-communists